The Moon Endureth, subtitled 'Tales and Fancies', is a 1912 short story and poetry collection by the Scottish author John Buchan.

Title 
In an introduction to the collection Buchan quotes from an article on St Francis in Lives of the Saints: "To the righteous is promised abundance of peace while the moon endureth". Psalms 72:7 in the King James Version has "In his days shall the righteous flourish; and abundance of peace so long as the moon endureth".

Content 
The collection includes the following short stories and poems. The stories Streams of Water in the South and The Rime of True Thomas were reprinted from a former collection, Grey Weather. The remaining tales had all previously appeared in Blackwood's Magazine.
 From the Pentlands Looking North and South (poem)
 I. The Company of the Marjolaine (short story)
 Avignon (poem)
 II. A Lucid Interval (short story)
 The Shorter Catechism (poem)
 III. The Lemnian (short story)
 Atta's Song (poem)
 IV. Space (short story)
 Stocks and Stones (poem)
 V. Streams of Water in the South (short story)
 The Gipsy's Song to the Lady Cassilis (poem)
 VI. The Grove of Ashtaroth (short story)
 Wood Magic (poem)
 VII. The Riding of Ninemileburn (short story)
 Plain Folk (poem)
 VIII. The Kings of Orion (short story)
 Babylon (poem)
 IX. The Green Glen (short story)
 The Wise Years (poem)
 X. The Rime of True Thomas (short story)

Critical reception
In its review of the first edition The Athenaeum noted "a marked leaning towards the mysterious and bizarre". The collection was said to show "considerable imagination, and occasionally a touch of delicate satire".

References

External links
 

1912 poems
1912 short stories
Hodder & Stoughton books
Works by John Buchan
British short story collections
British poetry collections